Jasmin Hilliard Fuentes (born September 3, 1998) is a footballer who plays as a defender. Born in the mainland United States, she represents the Puerto Rico women's national team.

Early life and college
Hilliard was raised in Medina, Ohio and attended Medina High School.

After graduating Florida International University, Hilliard played for the Wake Forest Demon Deacons while studying for a master's degree in business management.

International career
Hilliard was eligible to play for Puerto Rico through her maternal grandparents. She was capped for Las Boricuas at senior level during the 2018 CONCACAF Women's Championship qualification. In October 2021, Hilliard was recalled to the squad by coach Nat Gonzalez for two friendlies against Guyana.

References

1998 births
Living people
Women's association football defenders
Women's association football forwards
Puerto Rican women's footballers
Puerto Rico women's international footballers
Puerto Rican people of African-American descent
American women's soccer players
Soccer players from Ohio
Sportspeople from Cuyahoga County, Ohio
People from Middleburg Heights, Ohio
People from Medina, Ohio
African-American women's soccer players
American sportspeople of Puerto Rican descent
Southeast Missouri State Redhawks women's soccer players
FIU Panthers women's soccer players
21st-century African-American sportspeople
21st-century African-American women